Elinor S. Rice Hays (October 12, 1901 – March 21, 1994) was an American biographer and novelist.

Early life 
Elinor S. Rice was born in New York City, the daughter of Jacques Bernard Rice and Rose Frankfeld Rice. All of her grandparents were from Bavaria. Her father was a silver merchant. She graduated from Barnard College in 1923.

Career 
During her first marriage, Rice ran a bookshop and wrote three novels. She was a member of the Communist League of America. During the 1960s, she wrote two biographies, one of suffragist Lucy Stone, and one of the Blackwell family, especially the physician sisters Elizabeth Blackwell and Emily Blackwell.

Publications 

 The Best Butter (1938, novel)
 Action in Havana (1940, novel)
 Mirror, Mirror (1946, novel)
 Morning Star: A Biography of Lucy Stone, 1818-1893 (1961, biography)
 Those Extraordinary Blackwells (1967, biography)

Personal life 
Elinor Rice married twice. Her first husband was George Novack, a Marxist writer. With Novack she was friends with writers Lionel and Diana Trilling. The Novacks divorced in 1942. Her second husband was judge Paul R. Hays; they married in 1949; he died in 1980. She died in 1994, at age 92, in New York City. Her research materials about the Blackwells, and some personal papers, are in the collection of Columbia University Libraries.

References 

1901 births
1994 deaths
American women writers
Barnard College alumni
American Communist writers
20th-century American biographers
20th-century American novelists
American women novelists
American women biographers
Writers from New York City